Mladen Zrilić is a Serbian volleyball player.

Career
Zrilić started playing volleyball at age of 13 years old. He started his professional career in his home town Pozarevac playing for team known as Volleyball team Mladi Radnik. Mladen was on the youth and junior national team list and member as well for various competition.

Season 2005-06 team Hadberg SC from Austria

Season 2006-07 team Sibenk SC from Croatia

Season 2007-2008 team Mladi Radnik Pozarevac from Serbia 

Season 2008-09 team Trgu Muresh from Romania 

Season 2010-11 team Amrsvil from Switzerland 

Season 2010-11 team Kalamur SC from Lebanon

Season 2011-12 team Ghazir Sc Lebanon 

Season 2013-18 team El Jaish SC Qatar Doha

Qualifications
Academic: BSc Economy-Operational Management, College of professional studies for Management and Business communication, Sremski Karlovci, Serbia

 from 2016: Certified Volleyball Coach, III degree Faculty of Sport and Tourism, Novi Sad, Serbia 

 from 2018: licensed volleyball coach certified by https://www.ossrb.org/. Licence No. 239/17 member of coach organization from Serbia

 from 2021: CO of https://goldenfalconacademy.com/

References

External links 
 

1986 births
Living people
Sportspeople from Požarevac
Serbian men's volleyball players